D66 is a state road in Croatia, connecting A9 motorway with D8 state road in Matulji. D66 road serves as a connection to a number of towns and resorts along the eastern coast of Istria peninsula, including Opatija, Lovran and Ičići, as well as to Brestova ferry port, from which Jadrolinija ferries fly to island of Cres (D100). The northern terminus of the road also provides a link towards Rijeka via D8 state road and to Matulji interchange on A8 motorway. The road is 90.1 km long.

The road, as well as all other state roads in Croatia, is managed and maintained by Hrvatske ceste, a state-owned company.

Traffic volume 

Traffic is regularly counted and reported by Hrvatske ceste, operator of the road. Substantial variations between annual (AADT) and summer (ASDT) traffic volumes are attributed to the fact that the road connects a number of summer resorts to Croatian motorway network.

Road junctions and populated areas

Sources

D066
D066
D066